The Nanjing University of Posts and Telecommunications (NJUPT or NUPT) is a public university located in Nanjing, China. It is jointly developed by the Ministry of Education, the Ministry of Industry and Information Technology, the State Post Bureau, and the Jiangsu Provincial Government under the Double First Class University Plan.

The Academic Ranking of World Universities ranked NJUPT 601st–700th globally and 95th domestically for 2021, comparable to Baylor University and Syracuse University in the United States, and Liverpool John Moores University in the United Kingdom. The university achieved 24th in the subject of telecommunications engineering and 37th in transportation engineering among world universities.

History 
Established in 1958, the history of the Nanjing University of Posts and Telecommunications can be traced to the training class for the cadres of the General Postal Administrations during the wartime in 1942. Thereafter, it underwent a series of name and structural changes, including the Posts and Telecommunications Training Department of Shandong University (山东大学邮电专科部) and Shandong Postal School (山东邮政专科学校). Zhao Zhigang, Chief of the then Wartime General Postal Administration, served concurrently as the head teacher of the training class and the principal of the school in succession during the period from 1942 to 1947. In 1948, the school was formally named the East China Posts and Telecommunications School at Yidu (now called Qingzhou), affiliated to the East China General Administration of Posts and Telecommunications. It then moved from Jinan, Shandong to Nanjing, Jiangsu in August 1949. From 1942 to 1949, before the founding of the People's Republic of China, it fostered many talents in the field of posts and telecommunications for the revolutionary war.

In December 1950, it was chronologically enlarged into the Nanjing School of Posts and Telecommunications under the direct control of the Ministry of Posts and Telecommunications, the East China School of Posts and Telecommunications, the Nanjing Institute of Posts and Telecommunications, and the Nanjing University of Posts and Telecommunications. After the reform of the leadership system of national universities in February 2000, the Nanjing University of Posts and Telecommunications started to be jointly administered by both the central and the provincial government, with the provincial government playing the principle role. In March 2013, the university merged with the Nanjing College for Population Management (南京人口管理干部学院).

Academics

Schools and departments 
The Nanjing University of Posts and Telecommunications consists of 16 schools and departments, including:
 School of Telecommunication and Information Engineering
 School of Electronic Science & Engineering
 School of Opto-Electronic Engineering
 School of Computer Science & Technology
 School of Software (Compus Net and Computer Centre)
 School of Automation
 School of Materials Science & Engineering
 School of Natural Sciences
 School of Geography and Biological Information
 School of Media and Arts
 School of Economics and Management
 School of Humanities and Social Science
 School of Foreign Languages
 School of Oversea Education
 Department of Physical Education
 School of Continuing Education (School of Applied Technology)

Rankings 

NJUPT is a leading institution in many engineering subjects, such as telecommunications, transportations, electronics, and cybersecurity. Its highest national rank reached 76th in 2019 by the Shanghai Ranking.

References

External links
 
 

 
1942 establishments in China
Educational institutions established in 1942
Telecommunication education
Universities and colleges in Nanjing